4Ever, also known as Prince 4Ever, is a greatest hits album by American recording artist Prince,  released on November 22, 2016, by NPG Records and Warner Bros. Records. It is the first Prince release following the musician's death on April 21, 2016.

The two-disc set features 40 songs from Prince's tenure with Warner Bros. Records and features recordings from all of his albums between 1978's For You and 1993's The Hits/The B-Sides. It is the first Prince collection to include his number-one hit single "Batdance" from the soundtrack album to the 1989 film Batman.

4Ever features the first official release of the song "Moonbeam Levels", which had previously circulated on bootlegs of Prince's unreleased material in a low-quality form. The song had been recorded in 1982 during the sessions for 1999 and was subsequently considered for the unreleased 1988-89 album Rave unto the Joy Fantastic.

Track listing

Charts and certifications

Weekly charts

Year-end charts

Certifications

References

2016 greatest hits albums
Prince (musician) compilation albums
Albums produced by Prince (musician)
Warner Records compilation albums
Compilation albums published posthumously